Morgan Heights may refer to:

Morgan Heights, Colorado
Morgan Heights, New Jersey
Morgan Heights, West Virginia